Sekolah Menengah Kebangsaan Sultan Yussuf (or SYS) is a high school located in Batu Gajah, Perak, Malaysia.

History 
The school was established as a small private school in 1907, and was founded by Malai Perumal Pillay, a local merchant. In those days it was difficult to persuade parents in Batu Gajah to educate their children. Pillay achieved this by going from door to door in the township. Eventually, he gathered 30 children in the school together with three teachers from Taiping. The first class was held in his own home. K. Mudalir was the first Headmaster of the school. All the costs, including teachers' salaries, were met by Pillay.

The school move to a nearby site in 1908 when the Batu Gajah Prison donated the building material for the school from the old prison building. The people of Batu Gajah cooperated in community spirit gotong royongs and built the school. During that year, M.C. Champion was appointed to replace K. Mudalir as Headmaster.

Over the next two years, the number of students increased to 80. This forced Pillay to hand the school over, on 9 August 1910, to the government of British Malaya and it was renamed the Batu Gajah Government English School.

The school was later renamed Sultan Yussuf School after the Second World War

Special education
Special education classes were inaugurated in May 2010.

Regional centre
The school is the venue for regional educational events. For example, in May 2010 a workshop for English teachers was held here, as was the State junior competition dance championship in August 2008.

Notable alumni
 Sultan Azlan Shah (born 19 April 1928), the Sultan of Perak from 1984 to 2014.
 Jeffrey Cheah, Officer of the Order of Australia, founder and chairman of The Sunway Group of Companies.
 Firdaus Tarmizi, Malaysian rugby union player
 Saifuddin Khairil Anuar, footballer

Address 

 Sekolah Menengah Kebangsaan Sultan Yussuf
 Jalan Ilmu
 31000 Batu Gajah
 Negeri Perak, Malaysia
 Telefon =  6053633203
 Fax     =  6053669271
 Asrama  =  6053661612

References

External links
 
SMK Sultan Yussuf on Edublog
SMK Sultan Yussuf on WordPress
SMK Sultan Yussuf on Facebook
 Sejarah SMK Sultan Yussuf
 

Secondary schools in Malaysia
Publicly funded schools in Malaysia
Educational institutions established in 1907
1907 establishments in British Malaya